The 2013–14 NCAA Division I men's basketball season began in November with the 2K Sports Classic and ended with the Final Four in Arlington, Texas April 5–7. It was tipped off by the 2013 Champions Classic on November 12, 2013.

Season headlines
 June 11 – The NCAA releases its annual Academic Progress Rate report. Three Division I men's basketball programs will be ineligible for postseason play in 2013–14; three others are ineligible pending appeals and NCAA review of data. The penalized programs are:
 Arkansas–Pine Bluff (pending review)
 FIU
 Grambling State
 Mississippi Valley State (pending review)
 New Orleans
 Southern (pending review)
 November 4 – The Associated Press preseason All-America team is released.  Oklahoma State guard Marcus Smart was the only unanimous choice, gaining all 65 votes.  He was joined by Doug McDermott of Creighton (63 votes), Louisville guard Russ Smith (52), Kansas freshman Andrew Wiggins (42) and Michigan forward Mitch McGary (34).
 November 12 – Freshmen and transfers are eligible for the preseason Wooden Award watch list for the first time in the trophy's history.  Nine freshmen made the 50-member list, including three each from Kentucky (Andrew Harrison, Julius Randle and James Young) and Kansas (Andrew Wiggins, Wayne Selden, Jr. and Joel Embiid).  Jabari Parker of Duke, Aaron Gordon of Arizona and Noah Vonleh of Indiana were the other three freshmen named.
 February 27 – Shortly after the end of Utah Valley's 66–61 home win over New Mexico State in a battle between the WAC co-leaders, NMSU guard K.C. Ross-Miller throws a basketball at Utah Valley's Holton Hunsaker (son of UVU head coach Dick Hunsaker), hitting him in the leg.  The incident triggers a brawl between players and fans who had stormed the court, with video later showing that at least one NMSU player threw a punch, and another had to be forcibly pulled from the melee by staff. The next day, the WAC suspends two NMSU players—Ross-Miller for two games and Renaldo Dixon for one—for their involvement in the brawl. In addition, UVU announces that it was reviewing tapes of the incident to determine whether to take further action against its own students and fans who were involved.
 March 26 – South Florida, which had reached an agreement in principle with Manhattan coach Steve Masiello to fill that school's head coaching vacancy, rescinds the agreement after it discovers that Masiello lied on his résumé about graduating from the University of Kentucky. A UK spokesperson confirmed that Masiello attended for four years but did not receive a degree.
 April 7 – Manhattan announces that it will retain Masiello as head coach, contingent on him earning his bachelor's degree from UK. At the time, he was about 10 credit hours short of a degree, and was expected to complete the needed courses during the summer term. UK announced on May 29 that Masiello had completed the required coursework and would receive his degree in August.
 April 9 – UMass sophomore guard Derrick Gordon becomes the first active Division I men's college player to come out as gay.

Milestones and records
 Oakland guard Travis Bader, Devon Saddler of Delaware, Anthony Ireland of Loyola Marymount, USC Upstate forward Torrey Craig, Bryant forward Alex Francis, Cincinnati guard Sean Kilpatrick, Nevada guard Deonte Burton, Iowa State guard DeAndre Kane, Buffalo forward Javon McCrea and North Dakota swingman Troy Huff each passed the 2,000 point mark for their careers.
November 19 – Wisconsin junior forward Frank Kaminsky broke the school's single-game scoring record.  Kaminsky scored 43 points in a win over North Dakota.  The previous record of 42 points was held by Ken Barnes and Michael Finley.
December 14 – Aaron Craft broke Ohio State's career assist record (previously held by Jamar Butler) in a game against North Dakota State.
 December 18 – Texas Southern's Aaric Murray scored 48 points against Temple in the Liacouras Center, setting records for the most points scored against Temple by one player as well as a new arena record.
 January 25 – Duke head coach Mike Krzyzewski records his 900th career win at the school, becoming just the second Division I men's coach to achieve 900+ wins at one university (Jim Boeheim at Syracuse was the first; both were preceded in the women's game by Pat Summitt at Tennessee).
 Vermont forward Brian Voelkel became the first player in NCAA Division I history to record at least 1,000 career rebounds and 600 career assists.
 February 1 – Syracuse defeats Duke 91-89 in overtime before a record-setting crowd of 35,446, the largest basketball crowd in the Carrier Dome's history and an all-time NCAA record for an on-campus game.
 February 2 – Oakland's Travis Bader surpassed JJ Redick for the most NCAA Division I career three-point field goals made. Redick's 457 made three-pointers record had stood since 2007. He finished his career with 504.
 February 8 – Melvin Ejim of Iowa State scores a Big 12-record 48 points in an 84–69 win over TCU, surpassing Michael Beasley and Denis Clemente, both of Kansas State, who had 44 points in 2008 and 2009, respectively.
 February 10 – SMU enters the Associated Press Top 25 poll for the first time since the next-to-last poll of 1984–85, a span of 30 seasons.
 February 21 – Oakland's Travis Bader eclipsed Keydren Clark's career three-point attempts record of 1,192, which was set in 2006, almost three weeks after setting the new career three-pointers made mark. He finished his career with 1,246.
 March 1 – In his final college game, LIU Brooklyn point guard Jason Brickman became only the fourth men's player in Division I history to collect 1,000 career assists, finishing with 1,009. He also became only the second Division I men's player to average double figures in points and assists in the same season, after Avery Johnson of Southern in 1987–88.
 March 8 – Doug McDermott of Creighton became just the eighth Division I men's player to surpass 3,000 career points. He scored a career-high 45 points against Providence on Creighton's senior night to give him 3,011 at the time. He finished his career with 3,150, the fifth-most ever.
 March 9:
 Wichita State beats Indiana State 83–69 in the final of the Missouri Valley Conference tournament in St. Louis, becoming the first Division I men's team to enter the NCAA tournament unbeaten since UNLV in 1991.
 Coastal Carolina, led by head coach Cliff Ellis, beats Winthrop 76–61 in the final of the Big South Conference tournament. With the win, Ellis became just the 10th head coach to take four different schools to the NCAA tournament (he previously took South Alabama, Clemson, and Auburn).
 March 19 – East Carolina guard Akeem Richmond finished his career with 416 made three-pointers, good for sixth all-time in Division I history.

Conference membership changes

The 2013–14 season saw the largest wave of membership changes resulting from a major realignment of NCAA Division I conferences. The cycle began in 2010 with the Big Ten and the then-Pac-10 publicly announcing their intentions to expand. The fallout from these conferences' moves later affected a majority of D-I conferences. The most significant developments this season were:
 The original Big East Conference split into football-sponsoring and non-football conferences. The non-football league now operates as the newly chartered Big East Conference, while the football-sponsoring league operates under the old charter as the renamed American Athletic Conference (The American).
 With The American adding four members in 2013 and three more in 2014, all from Conference USA (C-USA), the latter league responded by adding eight members in 2013, plus one more in 2014. Four of the 2013 C-USA arrivals came from the Sun Belt Conference, which itself added three schools in 2013 and two more in 2014.
 The Western Athletic Conference saw near-total replacement of its membership. Only three schools that had been members in the 2012–13 season—Idaho, New Mexico State, and Seattle—remained in the WAC for 2013–14, and Idaho left for the Big Sky Conference after this season. The WAC's attempts to replenish its membership led to the demise of the Great West Conference.

In addition, four schools began the transition up from Division II starting this season. These schools were ineligible for NCAA-sponsored postseason play until completing their D-I transitions in 2017.

The 2013–14 season was also the last for several other teams in their current conferences:
 Four schools would leave the Southern Conference (SoCon). Appalachian State and Georgia Southern left for the Sun Belt, Davidson for the Atlantic 10, and Elon for the CAA.
 Three schools would join the SoCon, with East Tennessee State and Mercer moving from the Atlantic Sun Conference and VMI leaving the Big South Conference. Both ETSU and VMI were former SoCon members, having respectively left the league in 2005 and 2003.
 East Carolina, Tulane, and Tulsa would all leave C-USA for The American.
 As noted above, Idaho would leave the WAC and return its non-football sports to the Big Sky Conference (after an 18-year absence).
 Louisville and Rutgers would spend only one season in The American; they respectively left for the ACC and Big Ten.
 Maryland would leave the ACC for the Big Ten.
 Oral Roberts would leave the Southland to return to its previous conference home of The Summit.
 Western Kentucky would leave the Sun Belt for C-USA.

New arenas
 The Nebraska Cornhuskers left their home since 1976, the on-campus Bob Devaney Sports Center, for the new Pinnacle Bank Arena in downtown Lincoln. The Cornhuskers played their first game in the arena on November 8 against the Florida Gulf Coast Eagles.
 The Towson Tigers also left a venue that they had occupied since 1976, the Towson Center. Unlike Nebraska, Towson is staying on campus in the new Tiger Arena.
 The four Division I newcomers all used existing on-campus venues:
 Abilene Christian – Moody Coliseum
 Grand Canyon – Grand Canyon University Arena
 Incarnate Word – McDermott Convocation Center
 UMass Lowell – The River Hawks' main basketball venue is Costello Athletic Center. Another on-campus venue, the Tsongas Center, normally home to the school's ice hockey team, is available for games requiring a larger capacity.

Major rule changes
 Expanded the use of video review as follows:
 Shot-clock violations and who caused the ball to go out-of-bounds in the final 2:00 of regulation or overtime.
 Determine if a field goal is worth two points or three in the final 4:00 of regulation or in the entire overtime period.  Any other such review must wait until the next media time-out (16:00, 12:00 and 8:00 as well as the final 4:00 of the first half).
 Change the block/charge rule to not permit a defender from sliding in front of an offensive player at the last second to draw a charge.  The defender must be in position when the offensive player begins his upward flight with the ball.
 Increasing emphasis on hand-checking or extended arms on defense. 
 Permit the use of video review to determine if an elbow delivered above the shoulders of an opponent warrants a flagrant-1 or -2 foul (as was previously the case), a player control foul, or no call.

Season outlook

Pre-season polls

The top 25 from the AP and USA Today Coaches Polls.

Regular season
A number of early-season tournaments will mark the beginning of the college basketball season.

Early-season tournaments

*Although these tournaments include more teams, only the number listed play for the championship.

Conference winners and tournaments
Thirty-one athletic conferences each end their regular seasons with a single-elimination tournament. The teams in each conference that win their regular season title are given the number one seed in each tournament. The winners of these tournaments receive automatic invitations to the 2014 NCAA Men's Division I Basketball Tournament. The Ivy League does not have a conference tournament, instead giving their automatic invitation to their regular season champion.

Statistical leaders

Conference standings

Postseason tournaments

NCAA tournament

Final Four – AT&T Stadium

Tournament upsets
For this list, a "major upset" is defined as a win by a team seeded 7 or more spots below its defeated opponent.

National Invitation tournament

After the NCAA tournament field is announced, the NCAA invited 32 teams to participate in the National Invitation Tournament. The tournament began on March 18, 2014 with all games prior to the semifinals played on campus sites. The semifinals and final were respectively held on April 1 and 3 at the traditional site of Madison Square Garden in New York City.

College Basketball Invitational

The sixth College Basketball Invitational (CBI) Tournament began on March 18, 2014 and will end with a best-of-three final scheduled for March 31, April 2, and April 5; the final went the full three games. This tournament featured 16 teams who were left out of the NCAA tournament and NIT.

CollegeInsider.com Postseason tournament

The fifth CollegeInsider.com Postseason Tournament was held beginning March 17, 2014 and ending with a championship game on April 3, 2014. This tournament places an emphasis on selecting successful teams from "mid-major" conferences who were left out of the NCAA tournament and NIT.  32 teams participated in this tournament.

Award winners

Consensus All-American teams

The following players are recognized as the 2014 Consensus All-Americans:

Major player of the year awards
Wooden Award: Doug McDermott, Creighton
Naismith Award: Doug McDermott, Creighton
Associated Press Player of the Year: Doug McDermott, Creighton 
NABC Player of the Year: Doug McDermott, Creighton
Oscar Robertson Trophy (USBWA): Doug McDermott, Creighton
Sporting News Player of the Year: Doug McDermott, Creighton

Major freshman of the year awards
Wayman Tisdale Award (USBWA): Jabari Parker, Duke
Sporting News Freshman of the Year:

Major coach of the year awards
Associated Press Coach of the Year: Gregg Marshall, Wichita State
Henry Iba Award (USBWA): Gregg Marshall, Wichita State
NABC Coach of the Year: Gregg Marshall, Wichita State
Naismith College Coach of the Year: Gregg Marshall, Wichita State
 Sporting News Coach of the Year: Gregg Marshall, Wichita State

Other major awards
Bob Cousy Award (Best point guard): Shabazz Napier, UConn
Pete Newell Big Man Award (Best big man): Patric Young, Florida 
NABC Defensive Player of the Year: Aaron Craft, Ohio State
Frances Pomeroy Naismith Award (Best senior 6'0"/1.83 m or shorter): Russ Smith, Louisville
Senior CLASS Award (top senior): Doug McDermott, Creighton
Robert V. Geasey Trophy (Top player in Philadelphia Big 5): James Bell, Villanova
Haggerty Award (Top player in New York City metro area): D'Angelo Harrison, St. John's
Ben Jobe Award (Top minority coach): Willis Wilson, Texas A&M Corpus Christi
Hugh Durham Award (Top mid-major coach): Tony Jasick, IPFW
Jim Phelan Award (Top head coach): Tim Miles, Nebraska
Lefty Driesell Award (Top defensive player): Elfrid Payton, Louisiana–Lafayette
Lou Henson Award (Top mid-major player): Langston Hall, Mercer
Lute Olson Award (Top non-freshman or transfer player): Doug McDermott, Creighton
Skip Prosser Man of the Year Award (Coach with moral character): Brian Wardle, Green Bay
Academic All-American of the Year (Top scholar-athlete): Aaron Craft, Ohio State
Elite 89 Award (Top GPA among upperclass players at Final Four): Sam Malone, Kentucky.

Coaching changes
A number of teams changed coaches during and after the season.

References